10 on Ten is a 2004 Iranian documentary film directed by Abbas Kiarostami. It was screened in the Un Certain Regard section at the 2004 Cannes Film Festival.

References

External links

 
 

Iranian documentary films
2004 films
2000s Persian-language films
Documentary films about films
Films directed by Abbas Kiarostami
2004 documentary films